John McAdam is a technology executive.

McAdam holds a B.Sc. in computer science from the University of Glasgow, Scotland.
From January 1995 until August 1999, he served as the president and chief operating officer of Sequent Computer Systems, a manufacturer of high-end open systems, which was sold to IBM in September 1999. 
McAdam then served as general manager of the web server sales business at IBM. 
He served as president, chief executive officer and a director of F5 Networks from July 2000 until June 30, 2015. 
McAdam was re-appointed to the position on December 14, 2015, following the resignation of Manuel Rivelo. 
In January 2017 F5 announced François Locoh-Donou would replace McAdam in April.

References

External links
 F5 Leadership

Living people
Year of birth missing (living people)